Manchester Piccadilly Gardens bus station, often abbreviated to Piccadilly Gardens, is one of two main bus stations in Manchester city centre.

Adjacent is a Manchester Metrolink station named Piccadilly Gardens. The majority of the stands are located between Piccadilly Gardens and the Piccadilly Plaza, where buses for south or west Manchester usually begin or end their route. Other stands, also serving Piccadilly Gardens, are located on Oldham Street, Piccadilly or Lever Street for services heading towards north or east of Manchester.

The bus station was first opened on the site of the demolished Manchester Infirmary in 1931 to serve as the new terminus of the various extensive regional express bus services run by Manchester and its partners that had to be curtailed under the Road Traffic Act of 1930 and subsequent regulation of bus services. The station was extended in 1932/33 and finally extended to form the full length of Parker Street in 1935.

Services
There are numerous buses that use Piccadilly Gardens bus station. The majority of services are run by Diamond Bus North West, Magic Bus and Stagecoach Manchester with the remainder of services run by Arriva North West, Go North West and Manchester Community Transport.

References

External links

Buildings and structures in Manchester
Bus stations in Greater Manchester
Piccadilly Gardens